Staying Together is a 1989 American comedy-drama film directed by Lee Grant and produced by Joseph Feury (Grant's husband) and Milton Justice. The film stars Sean Astin, Stockard Channing, Melinda Dillon, Levon Helm (of The Band), Dermot Mulroney, Tim Quill, and Daphne Zuniga. Grant's daughter, Dinah Manoff makes a brief appearance. Channing and Manoff previously appeared together in Grease, released 11 years earlier. This is the last film directed by Lee Grant. Staying Together was released in the United States on November 10, 1989, and released in Japan on October 1, 1990.

Plot
Three brothers live at home with their parents and work at the family restaurant that has been managed by their father for the past 25 years. The brothers expect one day to take over the restaurant themselves, but one morning their father comes to the realization that he hates working there and he sells the restaurant without consulting the rest of the family. This begins to break apart the family, and one of the brothers, angry with the father's decision, leaves to find another job. The father subsequently dies from a heart attack.

Cast
Tim Quill as Brian McDermott
Sean Astin as Duncan McDermott
Dermot Mulroney as Kit McDermott
Melinda Dillon as Eileen McDermott, the mother
Jim Haynie as Jake McDermott, the father and owner of McDermott's Fried Chicken
Daphne Zuniga as Beverly Young
Stockard Channing as Nancy Trainer
Levon Helm as Denny Stockton
Keith Szarabajka as Kevin Burley
Sheila Kelley as Beth Harper
Dinah Manoff as Lois Cook, a waitress at the restaurant
Ryan Hill as Demetri Harper
Rick Marshall as Charlie

Reception
Staying Together was released on November 10, 1989 and made $4,348,025 at the U.S. box office in its opening ten days. It was released on VHS in the 1990s and on DVD in 2005. In a retrospective score by review aggregate website Rotten Tomatoes, it has an 80% score, with a weighted average of 5.8/10, based on only 5 reviews indicating "no consensus yet".

Awards
 Lee Grant was nominated for a Critics Award at the Deauville Film Festival in 1990. 
 Sean Astin won Best Young Actor Starring in a Motion Picture at the 11th Youth in Film Awards (now Young Artist Awards) in 1990.

References

External links

New York Times review

1989 films
American comedy-drama films
1980s English-language films
1980s sex comedy films
American sex comedy films
Films set in South Carolina
Films shot in South Carolina
Films directed by Lee Grant
American coming-of-age films
American independent films
1989 comedy films
Films scored by Miles Goodman
Films about brothers
1980s American films